Scouting in Yorkshire and the Humber is largely represented by the Scout Association of the United Kingdom and some Groups of traditional Scouting including the Baden-Powell Scouts' Association.

The Scout Association in Yorkshire and the Humber is part of the Scout Association North East Region, as is the Scout Association in Scouting in North East England. The Scout Association North East Region is the only one that covers two official regions of England.

There are also four student Scouting associations at various universities in the region, which are affiliated with the Student Scout and Guide Organisation (SSAGO). These are Students of Hull Association of Guides and Scouts at the University of Hull; Leeds University Union Scouts And Guides covering the University of Leeds, Leeds Metropolitan University and
Leeds College of Music, Sheffield Students in Guides and Scouts covering the University of Sheffield and Sheffield Hallam University. and Scouts And Girl Guides York at the University of York.

History of Scouting in Yorkshire and the Humber
Yorkshire and the Humber is proud to have scout groups that date back the very start of scouting in the UK.
1st Helmsley est. 1909

The Scout Association Counties

The Scout Association in Yorkshire and the Humber is administered through five Scout Counties, Central Yorkshire Scout County, Humberside Scout County, North Yorkshire Scout County, South Yorkshire Scout County and West Yorkshire Scout County.

Central Yorkshire Scout County

Central Yorkshire, provides Scouting opportunities for young people and adults in the metropolitan boroughs of Leeds and Wakefield and the surrounding area.

The County is currently divided into eight Scout Districts:

Leeds Templars. This district covers the eastern area of Leeds.
North Leeds
Pontefract and Castleford
Shire Oak (Leeds)
South Leeds and Morley
Wakefield
West Leeds
Wetherby

County Expeditions
The County organises international expeditions, enabling a number of Explorer Scouts and Scout Network members to undertake adventurous activities in other countries.

The next County Expedition is in 2008, where they will be visiting Kenya. The Expedition will consist of mountaineering on Mount Kenya, trekking by camel back, and a community project. There will also be a safari through a game reserve.

Humberside Scout County

Scouting in Humberside covers the former non-metropolitan county of Humberside. The headquarters of Humberside Scouts is at Raywell Park Activity Centre.

There are 8 Districts within the Humberside County:

 Beverley and Hornsea
 Blacktoft Beacon
 City of Hull
 Grimsby and Cleethorpes
North Lincolnshire
 Pocklington
 South Holderness
Wolds and Coast
The Districts within Humberside were changed as part of the restructuring in 2011/2012. During this time Boothferry and Haltemprice were merged into Blacktoft Beacon. On 30 May 2012, the three Hull Districts: East Hull, North Hull and West Hull merged to make one District named City of Hull.

North Yorkshire Scout County

North Yorkshire Scout County covers the county of North Yorkshire and is geographically the largest of the 4 Yorkshire scouting counties.

North Yorkshire Scouts celebrated the Centenary of scouting in 2007 by joining the Bilton Conservation Group to plant 2000 trees donated by the Woodland Trust.

In 2024, the county will be hosting the Larkin International Jamboree at Duncombe Park in Helmsley.

The County is currently divided into 12 Scout Districts:
Harrogate and Nidderdale
Ingleborough
Richmondshire
Ripon and District
Easingwold
Selby
York Ebor
York Minster
North Hambleton
Ryedale
Scarborough and District
South Craven

There is an active Scout Network in the county.

As of 2022, there are 6 Squirrel Dreys being run in the county.

The current County Commissioner, Max Butler, was appointed in March 2022.

South Yorkshire Scout County

Scouting in South Yorkshire includes Sheffield, Barnsley, Rotherham and Doncaster.

The County is divided into 7 Scout Districts:-

Sheffield Hallam
Sheffield Sheaf
Sheffield Norfolk
Sheffield Don
Barnsley (Barnsley, Pennine, Central and Fitzwilliam merged into Barnsley District)
Rotherham
Doncaster Danum

Sheffield Hallam is the largest District in the County with over 30 Scout Groups. Sheffield Hallam was formed when Sheffield Porter and Sheffield Rivelin merged in 2007.

The Doncaster Danum District has a Scout Band.

The Scout and Guide Shop (previously SGS Outdoors) is a combined Scout and Guide Shop in Sheffield with a full e-commerce website. There is also a Scout Shop in Doncaster with online access.

West Yorkshire Scout County
West Yorkshire  covers the metropolitan districts of Bradford, Kirklees, and Calderdale. The Scout county of West Yorkshire does not cover the whole of the West Yorkshire metropolitan county.  Because the West Yorkshire area is densely populated the boroughs of Leeds and Wakefield have their own Scout County called Central Yorkshire.

The Scout county's office is located within the Jubilee Centre at the Bradley Wood Campsite on the outskirts of Brighouse.

The county also operates a Water Activities Centre - Green Withens Watersports Centre at Green Withens reservoir near Ripponden.

West Yorkshire Scouts celebrated a successful centenary year of 2007.

West Yorkshire is subdivided into 14 Scout Districts:

Aire Valley
Bradford North
Bradford South
Brighouse
Halifax
Heavy Woollen
Holme Valley
Huddersfield North
Huddersfield South East
Huddersfield South West
Keighley
Pennine Calder
Spen Valley
Wharfedale

West Yorkshire has two Scout Bands - Revolution Show Corps (based in Queensbury) and Spen Valley Scout and Guide Band (based in Cleckheaton).

The County has a number of campsites and activity centres.

The current County Commissioner, Ian Womersley, was appointed in May 2020.

Campsites

Central Yorkshire

Aldwark Water Activity Centre
The Aldwark Water Activity Centre is owned and maintained by Central Yorkshire Scout Association County. The centre is located on the River Ure, 8 miles upstream from the city of York.

The centre has one large camping field, as well as a converted mill which consists of a number of dormitories. The centre has kayaks and boats for sailing, and runs training courses to gain qualifications in these activities.

Bramhope Scout Campsite
The Bramhope Scout Campsite is situated just outside of the village of Bramhope, approximately 8 miles north-north-west of Leeds. The site covers thirteen and a half acres of woodland and fields, offering various camping pitches for any sized camp up to a District camp.

As well as the camping pitches, there are a number of buildings on the site offering accommodation and indoor training facilities. The site offers archery, air rifles, pedal karting, climbing, abseiling, and pioneering, amongst other activities. There are also facilities located near to the site which enable sailing, kayaking and swimming.

Hunters Greave Scout Activity Centre
Hunters Greave Scout Activity Centre in Newlay, near Bramley, is operated by Shire Oak District. There is space for 100 campers.

Wike
The Wike 'back-to-basics' campsite is operated by North Leeds District Scout Council.

South Yorkshire

There are four camp sites:-

Hesley Wood Scout Activity Centre, Chapeltown, Sheffield.
Silverwood Campsite, Great Falls, Silkstone, Barnsley.
Squirrel Wood Campsite, Burghwallis, Doncaster.
Hundall Campsite, Sheffield Ridgeway.

Hesley Wood is used for Wood Badge and other Adult Leader Training.

West Yorkshire

Bradley Wood is the West Yorkshire Scout Association County Campsite, near Brighouse on the border of Kirklees and Calderdale. There are several others run by Scout Districts or Groups.

Blackhills Scout Campsite is run by the Districts of Bradford North and Bradford South.

Fanwood Activity Centre is run and managed by the Scouts and Guides of Spen Valley District, and is based in Gomersal near Bradford.

North Yorkshire

North Yorkshire Scouts, and its districts, have five campsites and activity centres:

Watson Scout Centre is a self catering accommodation centre for 32 people plus 1 acre of camping, located in the North York Moors National Park at Carlton-in-Cleveland
Snowball Plantation a 20 acre campsite on the east side of York which includes indoor accommodation
Thornthwaite Activity Centre & Campsite near Harrogate is in the Nidderdale Area of Outstanding Natural Beauty and close to the Yorkshire Dales National Park with 11 camping sites available spread over approx. 15 acres and room for up to 120 campers.
Tamarak Scout Camp set in the middle of Barlow Common nature reserve near Selby.
Birch Hall Scout Campsite a 15 acre forest site near Scarborough

The county also has a water sports centre located at Ellerton-on-Swale near Catterick

Gang Shows
Harrogate Gang Show.
Keighley Scout Gangshow, restarted in 2008.
Meanwood Gang Show
Northallerton Gang Show, started in 2005.
 1st Riccall Scout Group Gang Show - started in 2009.
Todmorden Gang Show, started in 1958 by Philip Suthers.Todmorden Gang Show
West Yorkshire Gang Show.
York Gang Show, started in 1987.

See also

Scouting sections
Scouting staff
Girlguiding North East England

References

External links
UK Scouting
 Apex Challenge - Adventure competition for Explorer Scouts and the Scout Network
 Sheaf District Classic Car Show and Gala

Scouting and Guiding in the United Kingdom